Tatiana Andreyevna Sorina (née Alyoshina; born 13 April 1994) is a Russian cross-country skier.

Personal life
Sorina is married to Egor Sorin, coach of the Russian ski team. On 11 March 2020, she gave birth to a daughter. During parental leave she skipped the 2019–20 FIS Cross-Country World Cup.

Cross-country skiing results
All results are sourced from the International Ski Federation (FIS).

Olympic Games
1 medal – (1 gold)

World Championships
1 medal – (1 silver)

World Cup

Season standings

Individual podiums
2 podiums – (1 , 1 )

Team podiums
 1 victory – (1 ) 
 1 podium – (1 )

Notes

References

External links

1994 births
Living people
Sportspeople from Tyumen Oblast
Russian female cross-country skiers
FIS Nordic World Ski Championships medalists in cross-country skiing
Cross-country skiers at the 2022 Winter Olympics
Medalists at the 2022 Winter Olympics
Olympic medalists in cross-country skiing
Olympic cross-country skiers of Russia
Olympic gold medalists for the Russian Olympic Committee athletes